Mitigation is the reduction of something harmful or the reduction of its harmful effects. It may refer to measures taken to reduce the harmful effects of hazards that remain in potentia, or to manage harmful incidents that have already occurred. It is a stage or component of emergency management and of risk management. The theory of mitigation is a frequently used element in criminal law and is often used by a judge to try cases such as murder, where a perpetrator is subject to varying degrees of responsibility as a result of one's actions.

Disaster mitigation
An all-hazards approach to disaster management considers all known hazards and their natural and anthropogenic potential risks and impacts, with the intention of ensuring that measures taken to mitigate one type of risk do not increase vulnerability to other types of risks. Proactive disaster mitigation measures are generally more effective than reactive measures in eliminating or reducing the impacts, but not all disasters are reasonably foreseeable, and when an unforeseen disaster occurs, mitigation is necessarily after the fact. Proactive disaster mitigation measures may be structural or non-structural, and will generally be based on measurement and assessment of the risk and the cost of setting up the measures, and possibly the cost of maintenance.
Mitigation planning identifies policies and actions that can be taken over the long term to reduce risk, and in the event of a disaster occurring, minimize loss.  Such policies and actions are based on a risk assessment, using the identified hazards, vulnerabilities and probabilities of occurrence and estimates of impact to calculate risks, and are generally planned in cooperation with the stakeholder groups. The principles are applicable to mitigation of risk in general.

Planning processes may include:
Stakeholder agreement on actions for risk reduction
Assessment of relative risk and vulnerability
Building partnerships among stakeholders
Increasing awareness of hazards, vulnerabilities and risk 
Establishing priorities
Aligning risk reduction and mitigation strategies with other objectives

Risk assessment and mitigation measures may include:
Hazard mapping
Flood plain mapping
Land use and zoning practices
Implementing and enforcing appropriate building codes
Reinforced tornado safe rooms
Burying of electrical cables to prevent ice build-up
Raising of buildings in flood-prone areas
Public awareness programs
Insurance programs

Index to Wikipedia articles on mitigation
Wikipedia has a range of articles on Mitigation in various contexts, including:

Environment
 
  in public administration; also, in particular:
 
  in emergency management; also, in particular:

Information technology
 Mitigation, a kind of defense against security issues in computing, as part of vulnerability management

Law
 Disaster Mitigation Act of 2000, a U.S. federal legislation passed in 2000 that amended provisions of the United States Code related to disaster relief
 Mitigation (law), the principle that a party who has suffered loss has to take reasonable action to minimize the amount of the loss suffered
 Also in law, mitigating factors may cause a crime to be considered less serious, or provide a reason to make a punishment less severe.

Occupational safety and health
Mitigation of the effects of incidents and health hazards is one of the central precepts of occupational safety and health, as workers may be exposed to hazards, and that it is not always possible to eliminate the associated risk, making it necessary to deal with the consequences on those occasions when harmful incidents occur.

Politics
 Mitigation of political risk

See also
 Harm reduction
 
 
 
 
 
 
 Risk Evaluation and Mitigation Strategies
 Disaster risk reduction

References

Risk management
Emergency management
Occupational safety and health